Gwen Svekis (born June 1, 1996) is an American softball player for the Chicago Bandits.

Career
She attended St. Thomas Aquinas High School in Fort Lauderdale, Florida. She later attended the University of Oregon, where she was an All-American catcher and NFCA Catcher of the Year for the Oregon Ducks softball team. Svekis led the Ducks to three Women's College World Series appearances in 2015, 2017 and 2018. She later went on to play professional softball with the Chicago Bandits of National Pro Fastpitch. She played in the inaugural season of Athletes Unlimited Softball league in 2020.

References

External links
 
Oregon bio
USA Softball Bio
Chicago Bandits Bio

1993 births
American softball players
Living people
Softball players from Florida
People from Davie, Florida
Oregon Ducks softball players
Chicago Bandits players
Sportspeople from Broward County, Florida